The Open Networking Foundation (ONF) is a non-profit operator-led consortium. It uses an open source business model aimed at promoting networking through software-defined networking (SDN) and standardizing the OpenFlow protocol and related technologies. The standards-setting and SDN-promotion group was formed out of recognition that cloud computing will blur the distinctions between computers and networks. The initiative was meant to speed innovation through simple software changes in telecommunications networks, wireless networks, data centers and other networking areas.

By June 2020, the ONF grew to over 200 member companies. Member companies include networking-equipment vendors, semiconductor companies, computer companies, software companies, telecom service providers, hyperscale data-center operators, and enterprise users.

Current ONF Projects address major components of the carrier, cloud and enterprise mobile networks.

Google's adoption of OpenFlow software was discussed by Urs Hölzle at a trade show promoting OpenFlow in April, 2012. Hölzle is the chairman ONF's board of directors, serving on the board along with representatives of the other five founding board members plus NTT Communications and Goldman Sachs. Stanford University professor Nick McKeown and U.C. Berkeley professor Scott Shenker also serve on the board as founding directors representing themselves.

The ONF launched a continuous certification program for products and equipment in the telecom and networking space. As part of certification, the Open Compute Project (OCP) is collaborating with ONF in this new program to promote the use of OCP-recognized open hardware in ONF solutions.

In 2017 the ONF completed its merger with the Open Networking Lab (ON.Lab). The resulting entity retained the ONF name in 2017.

In 2018 the ONF established its Technical Leadership Team (TLT).

In 2019 the ONF announced the public release of three Reference Designs (RDs): SEBA, Trellis and ODTN.

In 2019, the ONF announced that it had combined with P4.org and would be the host for all activities and working groups related to the development of the P4 programming language moving forward.

In 2020 T-Mobile Poland Announced with the ONF that it had achieved production roll-out of OMEC, the ONF's Open Source Mobile Evolved Packet Core 

In 2020 the Open Networking Foundation announced the release of Aether, the first open source platform for 5G, LTE and edge as a cloud services.

In 2021 the Open Networking Foundation announced its SD Core project addressing the 5G Open RAN 

In 2021, the Open Networking Foundation announced its SD Fabric project addressing Hybrid and Edge cloud.

In 2022, the Open Networking Foundation announced its SD RAN™ project was fully released to open source.

In 2022, the Open Networking Foundation announced its Aether™ private 5G project was fully released to open source.

References

External links

Organizations established in 2011
501(c)(6) nonprofit organizations